The Wyvern Theatre in Swindon, Wiltshire, England, opened in 1971.

It is managed on behalf of Swindon Borough Council by Wyvern Theatre Ltd, a subsidiary of HQ Theatres Ltd. The auditorium has 635 seats, all designed to be within 70 feet from the stage.

History
The theatre was built in 1968–71 by Casson, Conder and Partner as part of Swindon Civic Centre.  It is named after the mythical wyvern which was once the emblem of the kings of Wessex.

The building was opened on 7 September 1971 by Queen Elizabeth II and Prince Philip. The first performance was by a Ukrainian dance company.

On 3 September 2006, it closed temporarily after the discovery of traces of asbestos in the venue's offices and roof void during a routine inspection. It remained closed until September 2007 and the opportunity was taken to refurbish the venue, bringing new decor, bars, cafés, disabled entrances and new seating costing £1.3 million. The first performance afterwards was on 25 September 2007.

Management companies
 1971–1994 – Wyvern Arts Trust Ltd
 1994–2001 – Apollo Leisure – General Manager Ted Doan
 2001–02  – SFX Venues – General Manager Ted Doan
 2002–05  – Clear Channel Entertainment – General Manager Ted Doan, Andrew Lister
 2005–07 –  Hetherington Seelig Theatres Ltd. – General Manager Nick Shaw, Darren Edwards, Andrew Hill
 From 2007:  HQ Theatres, a joint venture between H.S.T Ltd and Qdos Entertainment – Theatre Director Derek Aldridge, Robert Miles, Laura James

Pantomimes
 1971/72 – Dick Whittington and His Cat
 1972/73 – Cinderella  starring Howell Evans and Sue Holderness
 1973/74 – Dick Whittington  starring Ian Lavender and Helen Shapiro
 1974/75 – Aladdin
 1975/76 – Mother Goose  starring Patsy Blower
 1976/77 – Snow White and the Seven Dwarfs
 1977/78 – Jack and the Beanstalk  starring Tony Brandon
 1978/79 – Cinderella
 1979/80 – Jack and the Beanstalk
 1981/82 – Aladdin starring Bernie Winters and Tim Swinton, Jackie Pallo, Jimmy Thompson and Anne Sidney
 1982/83 – Babes in the Wood Starring Jess Conrad (Robin Hood) & Norman Vaughan (Merry Norman)
 1984/85 – Cinderella starring Sheila Harrod (Dandini) Roger Dean (Ugly Sister Ruby) Don Crann (Ugly Sister Sal) and April Walker (Prince Charming)
 1985/86 – Aladdin starring David Griffin (Wishee Washee) & Don Crann (Widow Twanky) 
 1986/87 – Jack and the Beanstalk   starring Johnny Ball
 1987/88 – Babes in the Wood  starring Peter Duncan (Silly Billy) & Bruce Montague (Sheriff of Nottingham) & Pollyann Tanner (Maid Marion)
 1988/89 – Dick Whittington starring Andrew O'Connor (Idle Jack), Michael Groth (Dick Whittington) & Peter Denyer (King Rat)
 1989/90 – Mother Goose – Starring Adam Woodyatt (Silly Billy) and Chris Harris with Terry Hall and Lenny the Lion 
 1990/91 – Aladdin – Starring Floella Benjamin (Aladdin) and Bobby Gee 
 1991/92 – Cinderella – Starring Matthew Kelly (Buttons)
 1992/93 – Jack and the Beanstalk – Starring Trevor Bannister (Dame Trott) Mark Franklin (Jack) Hugo Myatt (Igor the Henchman) & Scarlott O'Neal (Jill)  
 1993/94 – Snow White and the Seven Dwarfs – Starring Brian Hibbard (Herman the Henchman) Dave Lynn (Queen Morgiana) & Danielle Carson (Snow White) & Pollyann Tanner (Fairy Godmother)
 1994/95 – Dick Whittington – Starring Jimmy Cricket
 1995/96 – Aladdin – Starring Timmy Mallett (Aladdin)  
 1996/97 – Cinderella – Starring Jess Conrad as Prince Charming and Bernie Clifton as Buttons
 1997/98 – Babes in the Wood – (Charles Vance Productions) Starring Paul Leyshon (Robin Hood), Hugo Myatt (the Sheriff of Nottingham) and the Roly Polys as the Merry Men
 1998/99 – Jack and the Beanstalk – (Charles Vance Productions) Starring Colin Baker (Dame Durden). With Rod, Jane and Freddy
 1999/2000 – Snow White and the Seven Dwarfs – (Charles Vance Productions) Starring Jacinta Stapleton (Neighbours''' Amy Greenwood) as Snow White and Paul Ladlow as the Wicked Queen. Also featured Mike McCabe and Sandy Martin (BBC Radio Swindon).  
 2000/1 – Aladdin – (Charles Vance Productions) Starring Aleetza Wood (Home and Away's Peta Janossi) as Aladdin, Geoffrey Hinsliff (Coronation Street's Don Brennan) as Widow Twanky, Bobby Dazzler as Wishee Washee and Juliette Kaplan (Last of the Summer Wine's Pearl) as the Empress of China. Also featured Tweedy & Alexis as Ping and Pong.
 2001/2 – Cinderella starring Emma Willis (Cinderella), Bernie Clifton (Buttons), Pollyann Tanner (Dandini), Paul Mead (Baron Hardup)
 2002/3 – Dick Whittington starring Geoffrey Hayes (Simple Simon), Pollyann Tanner (Dick), Hugo Myatt (King Rat), Colin Baker (Sarah the Cook).
 2003/4 – Goldilocks and the Three Bears starring Vicky Binns (Goldilocks), Howard Taylor (Ringmaster), Ross Davidson (Dame Dolly), Amanda Sandow, Alfie the Alligator and Willy Wyvern
 2004/5 – Jack and the Beanstalk starring Juliette Kaplan (Fairy), Paul Bradley (Fleshcreep), Jo Martell (Jill), Daniel Boys (Jack)
 2005/6 – Peter Pan starring Steven Pinder (Captain Hook), Daniel Boys (Peter Pan), Jonah Cook (John Darling), Aaron Jenkins (Michael Darling).  
 2007/8 – Cinderella starring Britt Ekland (Fairy Godmother) and Tequila her Chihuahua & Ross Hunter
 2008/9 – Aladdin starring Shaun Williamson (Abanazar), Neal Andrews (Wishee Washee)
 2009/10 – Sleeping Beauty starring Lorraine Chase (Carabosse), Ceri-Lyn Cissone (Sleeping Beauty), Edd Post (Prince Harry)
 2010/11 – Peter Pan starring Paul Nicholas (Captain Hook), Richard Vincent (Peter Pan), Pearce Barron (John Darling), Thomas Snowball (Michael Darling)
 2011/12 – Cinderella starring Keith Chegwin (Buttons), Saskia Strallen (Cinderella), Adam King (Prince Charming), Alex Young (Fairy Godmother)
 2012/13 – Aladdin starring Keith Chegwin (Wishee Washee) David Ashley (Abanazar) Suzie Chard (Fairy)
 2013/14 – Jack and the Beanstalk starring Keith Chegwin (Silly Billy), David Ashley (Dame Trot), Jennifer Greenwood (The Fairy)
 2014/15 – Dick Whittinton starring Nigel Havers (King Rat), David Ashley (Sarah the Cook), Lucy Kane (Alice Fitzwarren)
 2015/16 – Snow White and the Seven Dwarfs starring Adam Woodyatt (Chambers) & David Ashley (Nurse Nelly)
 2016/17 – Cinderella starring Ryan Thomas and David Ashley
 2017/18 – Peter Pan starring Adam Woodyatt
 2018/19 – Aladdin starring Adam Woodyatt
 2019/20 – Sleeping Beauty starring Michelle Collins and Adam Woodyatt
 2020/21 – No pantomime due to COVID-19
 2021/22 – Jack and the Beanstalk
 2022/23 – Beauty and the Beast starring Anne Hegerty

Behind the scenes

 

Awards

 2015 – The Wyvern Theatre was awarded the Venue of the Year Award at the annual HQ Theatre awards
 2016 – Trip Advisor Certificate of Excellence
 2017 – Trip Advisor Certificate of Excellence
 2017 – UK Theatre's Most Welcoming Venue in the South West
 2017 – Muddy Stilettos Best Theatre in the South West
 2018 – Trip Advisor Certificate of Excellence
 2019 – Trip Advisor Certificate of Excellence
 2020 – Not won due to COVID-19
 2021 – Not won due to COVID-19
 2022 –

Summer Youth Project

 1994 – Bugsy Malone 1995 – Annie 1996 – 42nd Street 1997 – My Fair Lady 1998 – Oliver! 1999 – Me and My Girl 2000 – Joseph and the Amazing Technicolor Dreamcoat 2001 – Crazy for You 2002 – West Side Story 2003 – Fame – 10th Anniversary year of SYP
 2004 – The Sound of Music 2005 – Guys and Dolls 2006 – Annie 2007 – No show due to temporary closure 2008 – Oliver! 2009 – Boogie Nights 2010 – The Wizard of Oz 2011 – Anything Goes 2012 – West Side Story 
 2013 – Our House 2014 – Bugsy Malone – 20th Anniversary year of SYP
 2015 – Hairspray 2016 – Grease 2017 – Summer Holiday 2018 – Oliver!''
 2019 – Chitty Chitty Bang Bang

Mascot 

Over the years The Wyvern Theatre has had its own mascot in the form of a 6-foot-high green dragon-like creature known as Willy the Wyvern.

Willy the Wyvern became the theatre's mascot originally during its founding years but faded into obscurity for over two decades. In 2001, Willy was reborn and returned to the Wyvern theatre with a new look and a new lease of life just in time to celebrate its 30th anniversary. He has now seemingly gone into retirement making rare appearances, the last being in the 2013 Summer Youth Project

References

External links
 

Theatres in Wiltshire
Buildings and structures in Swindon
Theatres completed in 1971